Sébastien Lakou  is a Congolese football Fforward who played for People's Republic of the Congo in the 1978 African Cup of Nations.

External links

Living people
Republic of the Congo footballers
Republic of the Congo international footballers
1974 African Cup of Nations players
1978 African Cup of Nations players
CARA Brazzaville players
Association football forwards
Year of birth missing (living people)